The 1951 Nemzeti Bajnokság I was the first ever edition of the top level championship in the Hungarian team handball for women. Four teams contested for the title and Csepeli Vasas SK were declared the inaugural champions.

Results

Final standings

List of champions
The following players have played for Csepel Vasas SK and were crowned as the first ever Hungarian champions:

 Mária Babér
 Mária Bognár
 Ilona Fekete
 Magda Kiss
 Júlia Mácsai
 Ilona Pápay
 Éva Pischni
 Mária Schütz

Head Coach: Andor Várady

References
 Historical tables of the women's Nemzeti Bajnokság I

1951 in Hungarian sport
1951 in handball
Handball leagues in Hungary
1951 in women's handball
1951 in Hungarian women's sport